Boxberger may refer to any of the following people:

Brad Boxberger (born 1988), American professional baseball pitcher
Erin Boxberger (born 1993), American rower
Jacky Boxberger (1949–2001), French track and field athlete
Rod Boxberger (born 1957), American professional baseball pitcher
German toponymic surnames